Contentious politics is the use of disruptive techniques to make a political point, or to change government policy. Examples of such techniques are actions that disturb the normal activities of society such as demonstrations, general strike action, direct action, riot, terrorism, civil disobedience, and even revolution or insurrection. Social movements often engage in contentious politics.  The concept distinguishes these forms of contention from the everyday acts of resistance explored by James C. Scott, interstate warfare, and forms of contention employed entirely within institutional settings, such as elections or sports.  Historical sociologist Charles Tilly defines contentious politics as "interactions in which actors make claims bearing on someone else's interest, in which governments appear either as targets, initiators of claims, or third parties."

Contentious politics has existed forever, but its form varies over time and space.  For example, Tilly argues that the nature of contentious politics changed fairly dramatically with the birth of social movements in 18th-century Europe.  

The concept of contentious politics was developed throughout the 1990s and into the 21st century by its most prominent scholars in the United States: Sidney Tarrow, Charles Tilly, and Doug McAdam.  Until its development, the study of contentious politics was divided among a number of traditions each of which were concerned with the description and explanation of different contentious political phenomena, especially the social movement, the strike, and revolution.  One of the primary goals of these three authors was to advance the explanation of these phenomena and other contentious politics under a single research agenda. There remains a significant plurality of agendas in addition to the one these three propose.

Contentious and disruptive political tactics may overlap with movements for social justice. For example, the political theorist Clarissa Rile Hayward has argued that theories, in particular that of Iris Marion Young, that situate the responsibility to correct large-scale injustices like institutional racism with the groups that benefit from oppressive institutions overlook the fact that people will rarely challenge institutions that benefit them. She argues that in certain cases contentious politics are the only practical resolution.

Prominent scholars

Academic journals
Mobilization: The International Quarterly Review of Social Movement Research
Social Movement Studies
Contention: The Multidisciplinary Journal of Social Protest

Notes and references

Further reading
Gamson, William A. The Strategy of Social Protest, 2nd ed. Belmont, CA: Wadsworth Publishing, 1990.
Goodwin, Jeff, and James M. Jasper, eds. Rethinking Social Movements: Structure, Meaning and Emotion. Lanham, MD: Rowman & Littlefield, 2004.
Jasper, James. The Art of Moral Protest: Culture, Biography, and Creativity in Social 	Movements. Chicago: University of Chicago Press, 1997.
McAdam, Doug. Political Process and the Development of Black Insurgency, 1930–1970, 2nd ed. Chicago: University of Chicago Press, 1999.
Melucci, Alberto. Challenging Codes: Collective Action in the Information Age.  Cambridge: Cambridge University Press, 1996.
Piven, Frances Fox and Richard A Cloward. Poor People's Movements: Why They Succeed, How They Fail. New York: Vintage Books, 1979.
Tarrow, Sidney. Power in Movement: Social Movements and Contentious Politics, 2nd ed.	Cambridge: Cambridge University Press, 1998.
Tilly, Charles. The Contentious French. Cambridge, MA: Harvard University Press, 1986.
Tilly, Charles. Popular Contention in Great Britain, 1758–1834. Boulder, CO: Paradigm Publishers, 1995b.

See also
Social movement theory

Civil disobedience
Comparative politics
Protest tactics
Political activism
Political communication